Brooklyn Visual Heritage is an online digital history website resource produced by Project CHART, presenting historical 19th and 20th century photographs of Brooklyn, New York City, held by several cultural institutions.

Project CHART was a collaboration between the Pratt Institute School of Information and Library Science (SILS), Brooklyn Historical Society, Brooklyn Public Library, and Brooklyn Museum. The three-year project was funded by the US Institute of Museum and Library Services (IMLS) through a grant submitted by Tula Giannini and the Laura Bush 21st Century Librarian Program. It made use of Pratt Institute SILS masters students. The website was launched publicly in 2013.

See also
History of Brooklyn
 Brooklyn Look

References

External links
 

2013 establishments in New York City
Internet properties established in 2013
American photography websites
Photo archives in the United States
History of Brooklyn
Images of Brooklyn
Digital history projects
Digital humanities projects
Pratt Institute